"Swallow" is a song by English Britpop band Sleeper, written by the band's vocalist and guitarist Louise Wener along with band guitarist Jon Stewart, and produced by Paul Corkett. "Swallow" was released as the follow up to Sleeper's debut single release, the "Alice in Vain" extended play.

At the end of 1994, "Swallow" was ranked at number 48 on John Peel's Festive Fifty. The following year, both "Swallow" and "Twisted" were re-recorded for inclusion on Smart, the band's debut album.

Background

"It's actually a misunderstood song", Wener told the band's official fanzine, denying that the song was about oral sex, adding: "it's about a relationship breaking down. It's actually a really sad song. It's also about when people steal all your secrets and know all there is to know about you and the image is a metaphor for that." Indolent released "Swallow" as a 7-inch and CD single on 31 January 1994, backed with studio versions of "Twisted" and "One Girl Dreaming", two tracks which the band were then playing as part of their live set. To promote the single, Sleeper performed a four-song set of "Twisted", "Pyrotechnician", "Bedside Manners" and "Hunch" at their first Peel Session.

Track listings

All tracks were written by Louise Wener and Jon Stewart.

 UK 7-inch single Indolent SLEEP 002
 UK CD single Indolent SLEEP 002CD

 "Swallow" – 2:42
 "Twisted" – 3:22
 "One Girl Dreaming" – 4:19

Charts

References

External links
 "Swallow" music video

1994 singles
1994 songs
Sleeper (band) songs
Songs written by Louise Wener